Anne Arundel County Public Schools is the public school district serving Anne Arundel County, Maryland. With over 80,000 students,<ref
name=fastfacts2013></ref> the AACPS school system is the 4th largest in Maryland and the 39th largest in the United States. The district has over 5,000 teachers supporting a comprehensive curriculum from Pre-K through 12th grade.

The district includes all of the county.

Schools
AACPS primarily consists of 79 elementary schools (Pre-K or K, through grade 5), 19 middle schools (grades 6–8), and 12 high schools (grades 9-12). AACPS maintains 2 centers of applied technology, 3 charter and contract schools, 3 special education centers, 1 alternative high school, 1 middle school learning center, and 1 center for emotionally impaired students known as the Phoenix Center.

Many AACPS schools have garnered recognition for their academic programs, with appointment as National Blue Ribbon Schools of Excellence and Maryland Blue Ribbon Schools of Excellence. These schools are marked below with symbols representing their National-level and Maryland-level awards.

List of high schools

List of middle schools

Partial list of elementary schools
AACPS elementary schools serve students from Kindergarten to 5th grade. Some schools  also offer a Pre-Kindergarten program for younger students who are "economically disadvantaged or homeless". Among AACPS's elementary schools are:

Public charter and contract schools
Chesapeake Science Point Public Charter School (CSP) is a magnet school for math and science. The school was founded in 2003 by the volunteer non-profit Chesapeake Lighthouse Foundation (CLF), after the Charter School Law (Bill 75) was put into effect in July 2003, authorizing the establishment of charter schools in the state of Maryland.  Admission to CSP is via an application and lottery basis.

Monarch Academy Glen Burnie (MAGB) is another charter school in Anne Arundel County. Monarch Academy serves students in Kindergarten through eighth grade.  It employs Expeditionary Learning, a project based learning model, and is located in Glen Burnie.

Monarch Global Academy (MGA) is a contract school in Anne Arundel County.  Monarch Global Academy serves students in Kindergarten through eighth grades.  It employs the International Baccalaureate Primary Years Program in K-6 and a project based learning model in grades 6–8. It is located in Laurel, Maryland.

Other schools of note
Center of Applied Technology North, Severn
Center of Applied Technology South, Edgewater
Mary E. Moss Academy, Crownsville
Ruth Parker Eason School, Millersville – full-day special education
Central Special School, Edgewater - full-day special education
Phoenix Academy, Annapolis

Leadership
AACPS headquarters are in the Parole census-designated place, near Annapolis.  The Carol S. Parham Building houses the Board of Education, school support departments, professional support facilities, and meeting spaces.

The school system is governed by an eight-member Board of Education. Seven members of the Board (representing each of the county's council districts) are elected to four-year terms (before 2018, these positions were appointed by the state governor), and one student member is voted to a one-year term by the general student body.

The Board appoints a Superintendent of Schools to administer the school system. The current superintendent is Dr. Mark Bedell, who has served in this capacity since 2022. Previous superintendents include:
 Dr. George Arlotto (2014-2022)
 Mamie J. Perkins, interim superintendent (2013-2014)
 Dr. Kevin M. Maxwell, 11th superintendent (2006-2013)
 Nancy Mann, interim superintendent (2005-2006)
 Eric Smith (2002-2005)
 Ken Lawson, interim superintendent (2001-2002)
 Dr. Carol S. Parham (1993-2001)
 C. Berry Carter II (1992-1993)
 Larry L. Lorton (1988-1992)
 Robert Rice (1986-1988)
 Edward J. Anderson (1968-1986)
 David Jenkins (1946-1968)
 George Fox (1916-1946)

Pop-Tart controversy
Anne Arundel County Public Schools made headlines in March 2013 when school officials suspended 7-year-old Josh Welch for chewing a Pop-Tart pastry into a shape they thought resembled a gun and pretending to shoot his classmates. This was not the first time AACPS had dealt with this situation in that way, as 2 years earlier, a similarly aged student by the name of Sean House was suspended for the same reason. The Welch family, represented by attorney Robin Ficker, subsequently appealed to the district to have the two-day suspension removed from Josh's record, but the appeal was denied.  The Welch family appealed the decision to the county school board, which upheld the suspension after a 2014 hearing. The Maryland State Board of Education also ruled to uphold the suspension. The suspension was again upheld in county circuit court in 2016, with an 11-page ruling that cited "the student’s past history of escalating behavioral issues" and confirmed that "a suspension was appropriately used as a corrective tool". Shortly after this ruling, the parents' suit was closed by mediation in the Maryland Court of Special Appeals with an "undisclosed settlement". Officials at the school and the county maintained that "the case was never about a pastry or a gun, but rather an ongoing behavioral problem. They said that the boy disrupted the classroom repeatedly and that the suspension was a last resort."

See also

Anne Arundel County
List of school districts in Maryland

Notes

External links 

 ED/IES/NCES Report: Characteristics of the 100 Largest Public Elementary and Secondary School Districts in the United States: 2002–03

School districts in Maryland
Education in Anne Arundel County, Maryland